Melvin Simon Productions was a short-lived film production company of the 1970s and 1980s. It was founded by real estate magnate Melvin Simon.

History
Simon got into filmmaking in 1976 when he was having a social game of golf with producer Harry Saltzman who needed money for a film he wanted to make called The Micronauts. Simon loaned him the rest of the money; the film was not made, but Saltzman repaid the loan by selling his house and Simon decided to get into filmmaking.

Simon totally financed The Chicken Chronicles which was distributed by AVCO Embassy and gave an early lead role to Steve Guttenberg.

The company's first major motion picture was Somebody Killed Her Husband, Farrah Fawcett Majors' first film since leaving Charlie's Angels, which he funded in mid 1977. The budget was $5 million.

Albert S. Ruddy secured finance for the $4.5 million Matilda from Simon and a British company, the Film Finance Group; Ruddy was to make two more movies for this partnership, including a film about the Rough Riders.

Melvin Simon's major movie was The Stunt Man for director Richard Rush. In November 1977 Milton Goldstein left Avco Embassy to become chief operating officer.

In February 1978 Simon signed a deal with Stanley Kramer to make The Runner Stumbles. He invested $1.6 million in When You Coming Back Red Ryder?

In June 1978 the Los Angeles Times called Simon "the hottest, most sought after source of filmmaking money in the business." He had three films about to be released, seven completed or being edited, and six either shooting or about to star.

"All my decisions are made on instinct," said Simon. "They tend to be neither logical or deductive but they work."

By this stage three films Simon was associated with had come out. The Chicken Chronicles was a flop. However Simon had a part interest in Rabbit Test and Manitou which were lucrative. Somebody Killed Her Husband was a box office disappointment but Simon made a profit of $2 million from pre-selling it. He also made a small profit from Matilda due to pre-selling it, although it flopped when released. When You Coming Back Red Ryder was a disappointment.

The next run of films were Dominique, Tilt, Love at First Bite, Wolf Lake, Cloud Dancer, The Runner Stumbles, The Stunt Man and two Canadian films, Blood and Guts and The Third Walker. The company struggled to find distribution for several of these.

By April 1979 six films of Simon had been released and he had spent an estimated $25–30 million. They then financed My Bodyguard.

Tilt performed poorly. The company's first big hit was Love at First Bite which they financed for over $3 million and earned $30 million. It was sold to AIP and Simon was looking for an arrangement with a Hollywood major.

20th Century Fox
In September 1979 20th Century Fox agreed to pick up all Melvin Simon's movies made in 1979 and 1980 in a deal worth an estimated $10 million. Excluded from the deal were films made before 1979 - The Runner Stumbles, Cloud Dancer and The Stunt Man. Films that were covered included The Man with Bogart's Face, Zorro the Gay Blade, 

Mel Simon films started flopping regularly at the box office: The Runner Stumbles, Cloud Dancer. However they had a huge hit with When a Stranger Calls.

In April 1980 the company announced it would make ten films over the next two years to be distributed by Fox. These would include Zorro the Gay Blade and Escape which became UFOria.

The Stunt Man was eventually released by Fox to excellent reviews. However the majority of the films flopped, notably Zorro the Gay Blade and the company started to wind back its operations.

The company had a huge hit with Porky's which it co financed with a Canadian company. In April 1982 Simon announced he would make films in partnership with Alan Landsburg

However, there were several more flop movies and Simon decided to leave the industry. "I did about 25 movies and I got out of it, thank God - it didn't cost me any money ultimately," Simon told a paper in 2002.

Filmink magazine later wrote "Simon’s legacy as a movie financier is actually very good – he just lacked a library of past titles to provide him with a diversified cash flow to ride out the bad times (every independent suffers from this problem)."

Films

Distributed by Avco Embassy
The Chicken Chronicles (1977) - star debut of Steve Guttenberg
Rabbit Test (1978) - star debut of Billy Crystal, directed by Joan Rivers - budget $1 million
The Manitou (1978) - starring Tony Curtis

Distributed by Warner Bros
Tilt (1979) - cost $3 million

Canadian Films
Blood & Guts (1978)
The Third Walker (1978)
Dominique (1978)

Distributed by AIP
Matilda (1978) - put up half the film's budget of $5 million made a profit of $450,000 from presales
Love at First Bite (1979) - starring George Hamilton - cost $3 million, earned $44 million
Seven (1979) - directed by Andy Sidaris - budget $2 million

Distributed by Columbia
Somebody Killed Her Husband (1978) - starring Farrah Fawcett Majors - distributed by Columbia - cost $5 million but they made a profit of $2 million by pre-selling the film
When You Comin' Back, Red Ryder? (1979) - cost $1.7 million
When a Stranger Calls (1979) - cost $1.5 million, gross $20 million - distributed by Columbia

Distributed by 20th Century Fox
The Runner Stumbles (1979) - directed by Stanley Kramer - cost $2.5 million
Scavenger Hunt (1979) - budget $7 million
The Man with Bogart's Face (1980) - budget $4 million sold to Fox for $2 million
The Stunt Man (1980) - cost $3.5 million
My Bodyguard (1980) - cost $3 million
Zorro, The Gay Blade (1981) - cost $12.6 million, gross $5 million
Chu Chu and the Philly Flash (1981) - cost $7 million, gross $220,000
Porky's (1981) - cost $4 million, gross $130 million
Porky's II: The Next Day (1983) - cost $7 million, gross $55 million
Porky's Revenge! (1985) - cost $8 million, gross $20 million

No Theatrical
Wolf Lake (1980) - directed by Burt Kennedy

Distributed by Blossom
Cloud Dancer (1980) - starring David Carradine

Distributed by Universal
UFOria (filmed 1981, released 1985)

References

Film production companies of the United States